Daniel Eugene Spivey (born October 14, 1952) is an American retired professional wrestler best known under the ring names "Dangerous" Dan Spivey, Dangerous Dan The Left Hand Man, Danny Spivey, Mr. America, and Waylon Mercy, and initially worked under the name Starship Eagle. Throughout his career, he has worked extensively for World Championship Wrestling, the World Wrestling Federation, and All Japan Pro Wrestling. He retired from wrestling in 1995 due to injuries and now works in alcoholism counselling in his native Florida.

Spivey spent a lot of his career as part of various tag teams and is especially known in the U.S. for teaming with Sid Vicious and then with "Mean" Mark Callous as "The Skyscrapers" in WCW and teaming with Mike Rotunda to form The American Express in WWF. He started his career teaming with Starship Coyote, collectively known as "American Starship". In Japan he teamed with various wrestlers over the years winning the World Tag Team Championship with Stan Hansen and teaming with Johnny Ace for long periods of time.

His last wrestling persona, Waylon Mercy, was inspired by Robert De Niro's portrayal of Max Cady in the 1991 remake of Cape Fear. While he only worked a few matches under that name, he later inspired the creation of the Bray Wyatt character as Spivey worked with Windham Rotunda to initially develop it.

Early life 
Spivey was born in Tampa, Florida. He attended the University of Georgia, where he played football for the Georgia Bulldogs for three seasons as a defensive end and was named an All-American football player in his sophomore year. Spivey aimed to play football professionally and was drafted by the New York Jets, but was forced to change his plans after suffering a severe knee injury in his junior year. Spivey spent several years working in a number of jobs in Tampa before meeting professional wrestler Dusty Rhodes, who offered to train him to wrestle.

Professional wrestling career

Championship Wrestling from Florida (1983–1984) 
Spivey was trained as a wrestler by Dusty Rhodes, the then-booker for Championship Wrestling from Florida (CWF) and made his debut in 1983. Spivey and Scott Hall formed a tag team in CWF called "American Starship". Spivey adopted the ring name "Eagle" and Hall the ring name "Coyote". The men wore furry boots, bright masks and silver pants.

Jim Crockett Promotions (1984–1985) 
In 1984, Rhodes moved from Championship Wrestling from Florida to the Charlotte, North Carolina-based Jim Crockett Promotions, bringing Spivey and Hall with him. Initially, American Starship worked only sporadically. At first, they were booked so sparingly that the two were given a job for the Charlotte Orioles (which Jim Crockett owned at the time) as part of the ground crew. When the two men did get into the ring it was with little success. The highlight of their stay in Jim Crockett Promotions was being defeated by Arn and Ole Anderson when the rookies challenged for the NWA National Tag Team Championship.

After working in MACW the duo joined Bob Geigel's NWA Central States territory based in Kansas City in 1985. The duo had a shot at the NWA Central States Tag Team Champions Marty Jannetty and "Bulldog" Bob Brown but did not manage to win the titles. Spivey's stay in the Central States territory was short-lived, according to Scott Hall Spivey did not like Kansas City. Spivey returned to the Carolinas where he worked as "American Starship" Eagle.

World Wrestling Federation (1985–1988) 

In the fall of 1985, Spivey signed with the World Wrestling Federation (WWF) and started wrestling without a mask and under his real name. Spivey was brought into team with Mike Rotunda as The U.S. Express after Barry Windham left the federation.

The team had their first match together on November 1, 1985 less than a month after Spivey joined the WWF. The team was sometimes billed as "The American Express", but most people referred to them as the U.S. Express II since the patriotic gimmick of the original U.S. Express was recycled with Spivey taking Barry Windham's place. The team continued the U.S. Express' feud with the Dream Team, but once they were proven unsuccessful, the two did not team from January to May as Rotundo briefly left the WWF. During this time Spivey took part in the WrestleMania 2 "Wrestlers and Football players" Battle Royal. Spivey was eliminated by The Iron Sheik without much fanfare. Once the American Express reunited, they feuded with The Moondogs, The Hart Foundation, and The Islanders, whom the team faced in their last match together on February 9, 1987.

Not long before Rotundo left the WWF, Spivey began to be billed as "Golden Boy" Danny Spivey which continued for his singles run after Rotundo left. His in-ring appearance at the time led to many fans labelling him a Hulk Hogan clone. As the "Golden Boy", Spivey wrestled in yellow trunks and boots, this colour choice combined with his height, build and blond hair saw him resemble the then WWF Champion. Spivey took part in the 1986 King of the Ring tournament, losing to Nikolai Volkoff in the first round. He also tried a new tag team partner. In March 1987 Spivey teamed with Tito Santana to unsuccessfully challenge the Hart Foundation for the tag team titles. Spivey was also part of the 1987 King of the Ring. This time he lost to Rick Martel in the first round. Spivey stayed with the WWF until the spring of 1988, becoming a heel and competing mainly against such low carders as Lanny Poffo and Outback Jack.

In 1991, Spivey testified that Dr George Zaharian had illegally supplied him with anabolic steroids in the late 1980s. Zaharian was ultimately found guilty.

All Japan Pro Wrestling (1988–1995) 
After working exclusively in the United States since his debut, while making some appearances in Puerto Rico for the World Wrestling Council, Bruiser Brody talk to Spivey about going to Japan, Spivey started to tour with All Japan Pro Wrestling (AJPW) in the summer of 1988 and kept touring with the company every year until 1995, when he signed with the WWF. In his first tour, Spivey gained ring experience by competing with Japanese wrestling legend Genichiro Tenryu. Spivey also teamed with Johnny Ace, a man he would team with many times during his Japanese tours.

Jim Crockett Promotions/World Championship Wrestling (1989–1992)

1989
In early 1989, Spivey returned to the NWA and Jim Crockett. Spivey was made a member of The Varsity Club as a replacement for Rick Steiner, who left the group. Spivey's background as a football player at the University of Georgia was touched upon to lend credibility to his inclusion in the group. While in the Varsity Club, Spivey feuded with Rick Steiner and the Road Warriors, acting more as back-up while former tag team partner Mike Rotunda and Steve Williams were pushed as the stars of the group. When the Varsity Club disbanded, Spivey came under the management of ex-referee Teddy Long and started teaming with newcomer Sid Vicious under the name of The Skyscrapers. The Skyscrapers' (so named due to their height and leaness) first taste of success came at the Great American Bash pay-per-view, where they first co-won a Two-Ring King of the Hill Battle Royal with Sid being the survivor in one ring and Spivey surviving in the other. The rules called for the two to fight each other but manager Teddy Long convinced them to shake hands and share the prize money. Later in the night, the Skyscrapers defeated The Dynamic Dudes due to their overwhelming size and power.

The Skyscrapers quickly became involved in a feud with the Road Warriors, sparked by Teddy Long's actions while he was still a referee. The two teams were very evenly matched in power and intensity, creating a series of matches that did not favor one team over the other. Spivey and Vicious were disqualified against the Road Warriors at Halloween Havoc. Shortly after Halloween Havoc, the Skyscrapers faced the Steiner Brothers at Clash of the Champions IX in a hard hitting match. Sid Vicious suffered a punctured lung due to a broken rib. With Vicious out of action, Teddy Long brought in another tall newcomer in the same mold as Sid Vicious and Dan Spivey and dubbed him "Mean" Mark Callous. At the same time while working for the NWA as one of the Skyscrapers, Spivey also competed in his home state of Florida, winning the NWA Florida Heavyweight Championship in late 1989. However, this title win was not referred to on NWA Television. Spivey would go on to hold the title until July 1992, when he lost it to Lou Perez.

1990
The New Skyscrapers immediately picked up the feud with the Road Warriors and kept on having inconclusive matches with them. At Clash of the Champions X the Skyscrapers finally got the better of the Road Warriors, not in the match, but afterwards when they beat the Road Warriors down. At this point in time, no one had ever been able to physically dominate the Road Warriors, something that pointed that big things had been planned for the Skyscrapers. However, in the days before the scheduled Chicago Street Fight at WrestleWar 1990, Dan Spivey suddenly left WCW, leaving the bookers to scramble for a replacement. Spivey stated in a shoot interview that he left the company over money issues, as well as his dislike of the Road Warriors themselves for taking what he perceived as liberties with his tag-team partner "Mean" Mark Callous.

Spivey kept on touring with AJPW while working for the NWA, mainly teaming with Stan Hansen. Spivey and Hansen formed a very popular Gaijin team that almost won AJPW's "World's Strongest Tag Determination League" in 1990. On September 1, Spivey made his return to WCW when he substituted for former partner Sid Vicious against Lex Luger at a house show in Greensboro, NC, losing via countout. Spivey returned to television on the September 14 edition of the WCW Power Hours, where he discussed facing Brian Pillman. On the same show he would defeat Lou Perez. On the September 16 edition of WCW Main Event, Spivey prevented Pillman from running the Gauntlet and won $5,000.

Spivey's next appearance came at Halloween Havoc 1990, where he threw a cowbell to AJPW partner Stan Hansen to use in a match against United States Champion Lex Luger. Hansen used the weapon and ended Luger's record title reign; this would in turn lay the groundwork for an eventual feud between Luger and Spivey. But before this could take place it was announced that the original Skyscrapers would reunite at Starrcade (1990). This took place, and  he and Sid Vicious made short work of The Big Cat and The Motor City Madman.

1991
With Sid Vicious being part of the Four Horsemen, the Skyscraper reunion was short-lived. Instead, Spivey started to focus on his singles career in WCW, challenging WCW U.S. Champion "The Total Package" Lex Luger at the February 24, 1991 PPV WrestleWar. Spivey did not win the title, although he continued to receive opportunities during house shows in March 1991. However, he would not receive another high-profile title opportunity on television while with the company. In April, he found himself teaming with various combinations of the Four Horsemen and reunited with manager Teddy Long. In May he formed a short-lived tag-team with The Angel of Death (Dave Sheldon), the duo making their debut on the June 6 edition of WCW Pro and defeating Larry Santo and Keith Hart.

On May 19 at the inaugural SuperBrawl PPV, Spivey defeated Ricky Morton. That month he also began teaming with Stan Hansen in WCW; the duo having already captured the All Japan Pro Wrestling World Tag-Team Championship from Terry Gordy and Steve Williams in Tokyo, Japan on April 18, 1991. On June 22, 1991, Spivey and Hansen were booked to face Rick Steiner and Tom Zenk and Spivey was told to lose the match to Zenk. Spivey refused since the duo were the World Tag Team Champions. After further discussions, Dan Spivey once again left WCW. Stan Hansen would depart a day later after being booked to be a part of The Desperados angle that was airing on WCW programming.

Spivey and Hansen would lose the tag-team titles back to Gordy and Williams. After the title loss, Spivey started to team with other wrestlers, mainly with Johnny Ace, but also linked up with Jim Brunzell, Kendall Windham and Jim Steele.

1992
Spivey managed to mend fences with WCW and was brought in by new WCW Executive Vice President Bill Watts at the start of the summer of 1992. He made his televised return on July 4 edition of WCW Pro, defeating Gary Jackson. Spivey was given a renewed push and was undefeated in the summer against lower-level opposition. He also found himself frequently teaming with fellow new signing, The Barbarian. On August 6, 1992 he beat Tom Zenk at a house show in Fayetteville, NC. He was originally booked to team with The Barbarian at the Clash of the Champions XX in a match against Barry Windham and Dustin Rhodes, but was replaced by the newly arrived Butch Reed. He returned in December and suffered his first singles loss of his comeback on December 12, 1992 in Columbus, OH when he was defeated by WCW World Champion Ron Simmons. After another defeat to Simmons the following night, he teamed with Big Van Vader in a loss to Ron Simmons and WCW Television Champion Ricky Steamboat at a house show on December 13 in Greensboro, NC. On television, his biggest match during this time was his appearance at Starrcade where he teamed with Van Hammer to defeat Johnny B. Badd and Cactus Jack to advance in the "Lethal Lottery". Spivey was eliminated from the main event battle royal by eventual winner The Great Muta.

1993
Spivey opened the year with a televised singles loss to Dustin Rhodes on the January 2, 1993 edition of WCW Worldwide. This match, having been previously taped in December 9, 1992 would be his last chronological match with the promotion.

Universal Wrestling Federation (1990, 1994) 
In 1990, Spivey made regular American appearances for Herb Abrams' Universal Wrestling Federation (UWF). In 1994 he defeated Johnny Ace at UWF's Blackjack Brawl to become the only UWF Americas Champion.

World Wrestling Federation (1995) 
Spivey rejoined the WWF in June 1995, adopting the name "Waylon Mercy" in a character based on Robert De Niro's portrayal of Max Cady in the 1991 remake of Cape Fear. Like Cady, he had jet black hair, wore white attire with a Hawaiian shirt, and sported several strange tattoos, including one of a dagger on his forehead (Spivey's were temporary). The character was introduced through a series of vignettes that always had Spivey speaking in a calm yet sinister manner. In the final vignette before premiering the character in-ring, Spivey predicted that soon, "Lives are gonna be in Waylon Mercy's hands," a phrase that would later feature in his entrance music.

Spivey portrayed a heel despite his character acting as a peaceful southern gentleman outside the ring. Waylon would shake the hands of the fans and thank them for coming to see him wrestle, his opponent, and even the referee before his matches. However, once the bell rang, he became vicious, insincerely apologizing for actions such as kicking or choking a downed opponent. Mercy's finishing move saw him apply a sleeper hold as he revealed a wide-eyed, insane expression. Once the bell rang, he would return to his "peaceful southern gentleman" act.

Mercy was pushed upon his debut with victories over numerous enhancement talents (including a young Jeff Hardy), as well as established stars such as Bob Holly, The 1-2-3 Kid, and Doink The Clown. Soon after, he competed in matches with the top faces of the WWF at the time, such as Bret Hart, Razor Ramon, and WWF World Heavyweight Champion Diesel. Spivey's only pay-per-view appearance as Waylon Mercy came at In Your House 3, where he lost to Savio Vega. Spivey defeated Diesel by countout in his last televised match. He retired from WWF in October 1995.

Retirement (1995–present) 
Spivey retired in 1995 due to injuries. After retiring, Spivey briefly attempted to forge a career as a fashion model. He went on to work for Spivey Underground Utility Construction Company, a construction company owned by his family.
In 2014, Windham Rotunda revealed that his character of Bray Wyatt was given to him by Spivey who was attending the WWE Performance Center at the time and shares a number of similarities with the Waylon Mercy character.

On August 1, 2015, Spivey, at age 62, who hadn't wrestled since 1995 due to injuries, returned to the ring for Dory Funk Jr.'s !BANG! promotion. Spivey and Funk worked a 10-man Japanese Banzai match.

Spivey also voiced Mercy the Buzzard in Bray Wyatt's Firefly Funhouse segments in 2019, as the puppet was based on Waylon Mercy.

Personal life 
Spivey was arrested on July 14, 2007 for driving under the influence in Odessa, Florida. He was released on $500 bond. He became sober in April 2009. He now owns his own company, Spivey's Sober Companions, in Odessa and Stamford, Connecticut. Spivey is also the Ambassador for the breakfast restaurant chain, The Breakfast Station in Florida.

Championships and accomplishments 
 All Japan Pro Wrestling
 World Tag Team Championship (1 time) – with Stan Hansen
 World's Strongest Tag Determination League New Wave Award (1988) – with Johnny Ace
 World's Strongest Tag Determination League Distinguished Award (1990, 1991) - with Stan Hansen 
 Championship Wrestling from Florida
 FCW Heavyweight Championship (2 times)
George Tragos/Lou Thesz Professional Wrestling Hall of Fame
Frank Gotch Award (2022)
 Pro Wrestling Illustrated
 Ranked No. 43 of the top 500 singles wrestlers in the PWI 500 in 1992
 Universal Wrestling Federation
 UWF Americas Championship (1 time)

See also 
 The Skyscrapers
 The U.S. Express
 The Varsity Club

References

External links 
 
 

1952 births
American male professional wrestlers
Georgia Bulldogs football players
Living people
People from Tampa, Florida
Professional wrestlers from Florida
People from Odessa, Florida
20th-century professional wrestlers
World Tag Team Champions (AJPW)
NWA Florida Heavyweight Champions